A military library or base library, is a special library used by military personnel, their dependents, and civilian contractors located within or associated with a military base or defense organization. The primary duty of many military libraries is to assist with professional development, personal education, and leisure.

Services 
In the United States, military libraries often offer similar services to public libraries. They are often associated with a particular base, and their services are available only to the users of that base. Things like book borrowing, providing meeting spaces, computer access, and digital resources are all common services. Additionally, speciality material required of military members is often accessible in case the member does not have other access outside of their workplace. .MIL computers and computers with Common Access Card (CAC) card readers are some of these common services. Professional development and personal education are important features of military library services, with many libraries offering test preparation materials. The library and other education centers for the base may be combined.

Many base libraries provide leisure programming for all ages. Storytime, homework help, and group activities are all common programs.

Online services may be provided by the individual library or a larger organization. Military OneSource is a large provider of online resources that are available to many military-affiliated people. King's Bay Military Library is a joint venture of the  Naval Submarine Base Kings Bay and Valdosta State University.

Overseas bases of the United States also have libraries. For Europe, United States Air Forces in Europe (USAFE) Libraries manages a network of libraries for Air Force bases. Those assigned to a USAFE base, or a Geographically Separated Unit (GSU) are allowed access to this network. USAFE Libraries also offers InterLibrary Loan (ILL) between their locations.

Staffing 
Depending on the responsibilities of the library, it may be staffed by civilian librarians, military personnel with library or organizational training, or both.

The Special Libraries Association (SLA) has a Military Libraries Community, that brings together librarians and paraprofessionals working at Military Libraries all over the world. The Military Libraries Community holds a biennial workshop and virtual tours of military libraries.

References 

Libraries by type
Military education and training